Walter Thomas Price, IV, known as Four Price (born October 8, 1967), is a Republican member of the Texas House of Representatives for District 87, which includes Carson, Hutchinson, Moore, Potter, and Sherman counties in the Texas Panhandle.

Election history

Price ran without opposition in the general election held on November 6, 2018. Shortly thereafter, he withdrew his candidacy for Texas House Speaker, having unsuccessfully, along with several others, sought to succeed the retiring Joe Straus of San Antonio. Instead, Price endorsed Republican Dennis Bonnen of Angleton in Brazoria County, who emerged as the consensus choice for the speakership.

References

External links
 Campaign website
 Legislative website

1967 births
Living people
Politicians from Amarillo, Texas
Republican Party members of the Texas House of Representatives
Texas lawyers
Tascosa High School alumni
McCombs School of Business alumni
St. Mary's University School of Law alumni
American Presbyterians
21st-century American politicians